The 2012–13 GNF 2 was the 52nd season of Botola 2 (the 2nd tier football league in Morocco). The season started on 15 September 2012 and ended on 2 June 2013.

On 28 April 2013, Kawkab Marrakech secure their promotion to Botola Pro after their victory against TAS Casablanca with score 1-0 in their home match, they also clinched their title after their goalless drew in their home match against MC Oujda on 18 May 2013. Later, Association Sportive Sale promoted after defeat Olympique Marrakech 2-0 in their away match on 25 May 2013 while Ittihad Khemisset defeat Racing Casablanca 1-0 in their home match four days later left them 6 points away from safety with only 1 game left.

On 18 May 2013, Olympique Marrakech was relegated to GNFA 1 for 2013-14 season after defeated by USM Oujda in their away match with 2-0  left them 7 points away from safety with only 2 game left. TAS Casablanca also relegated after defeated by same team (USM Oujda) in their away match with score 2-0 on 2 June 2013. Union Sportive Temara ahead from TAS Casablanca on their goal difference (US Temara goal difference is -8 while TAS Casablanca goal difference is -10).

Promotion and relegation
Teams promoted from 2011–12 GNFA 1
 Olympique Marrakech
 USM Oujda

Teams relegated from 2011–12 Botola
 JSM Laayoune
 Ittihad Khemisset

League standings

Morocco
1